Manikgonj Sadar is an upazila of Manikgonj District in the division of Dhaka, Bangladesh.

Geography
It has a total area of 214.81 km2.

Demographics

According to the 2011 Bangladesh census, Manikganj Sadar Upazila had 71,202 households and a population of 309,413, 23.3% of whom lived in urban areas. 9.0% of the population was under the age of 5. The literacy rate (age 7 and over) was 56.0%, compared to the national average of 51.8%.

Sports
Manikganj Stadium is located by the Manikganj public library, Manikganj, Bangladesh.

Administration
Manikganj Sadar Upazila is divided into Manikganj Municipality and ten union parishads: Atigram, Bhararia, Betila-Mitra, Dighi Union, Garpara, Hatipara, Jagir, Krishnapur, Nabagram, Putail. The union parishads are subdivided into 270 mauzas and 315 villages.

Manikganj Municipality is subdivided into 9 wards and 50 mahallas.

Education

Among the educational
institutions -
 Colonel Malek Medical College
 Madrasa Darul Ulum Manikganj
 NPI University of Bangladesh
 Government Debendra College
 Hatipara High School
 Manikganj Govt. High School
 S.K. Govt. Girls High School Manikganj
 Manikganj Medical College
 Muljan High School, Manikganj
 Government Textile Vocational Institute Manikganj
 Rajibpur high school
 Rajibpur adarsha college
 B.K.G high school
 Atigram A.c. High School
 Itqan International School

See also
 Upazilas of Bangladesh
 Districts of Bangladesh
 Divisions of Bangladesh

References

 
Upazilas of Manikganj District